Paula Twining (born 23 April 1982) is a New Zealand rower.

In 2001, she won silver at the World Championships in Lucerne, Switzerland as number two oarsman in the quadruple sculls with teammates Sonia Waddell (bow), and sisters Caroline and Georgina Evers-Swindell.

References

Living people
1982 births
New Zealand female rowers
World Rowing Championships medalists for New Zealand
21st-century New Zealand women